Thomas Allan (1725–1798) was an Irish politician.

Allan sat in the Irish House of Commons as the Member of Parliament for Killybegs between 1768 and 1776. In 1773 he was appointed Commissioner for Revenue in Ireland. He then represented Naas from 1777 to 1783. Between 1778 and 1785 Allan served as Commissioner of Customs in England.

References

1725 births
1798 deaths
Irish MPs 1769–1776
Irish MPs 1776–1783
Members of the Parliament of Ireland (pre-1801) for County Kildare constituencies
Members of the Parliament of Ireland (pre-1801) for County Donegal constituencies